Wynncraft is a fantasy massively multiplayer online role-playing game (MMORPG) Minecraft server created by Jumla, Salted, and Grian, and released in April 2013. According to Salted, one of the server's owners, over 2.9 million players have played on the server as of March 2021.

Gameplay  
Wynncraft's gameplay revolves around completing quests, joining guilds, and fighting bosses, among other things. Players are required to select a class between Archer, Assassin, Mage, Warrior, and Shaman; and after a tutorial start in the Wynn province, one of Wynncraft's five known provinces. The server's world has an approximate size of 4,400 by 5,500 blocks, and consists of two continents, Wynn and Gavel, divided by an ocean with islands. Wynncraft's design is inspired by the MMORPG RuneScape, and as of 2021, it has hundreds of quests. Aside from the cost of Minecraft, the server is free-to-play, with players being able to purchase cosmetic in-game items.

Reception 
Wynncraft has been praised for its extensiveness and gameplay. Writing for Kotaku Australia, Luke Plunkett praised Wynncraft's map and called the server "a full and proper MMO". Carl Velasco of Tech Times said that the server is "nuts" and "a stunning example of what can be created using Minecraft own sandbox engine". Austin Wood, writing for PC Gamer, was "continually floored by all you can do". Ewan Moore of UNILAD stated that the server is representative of Minecraft expansive scope. As of 4 July 2017, Wynncraft is the largest MMORPG built in Minecraft, according to the Guinness World Records.

References

External links 
Official website
Official wiki

Minecraft servers
Massively multiplayer online role-playing games
Internet properties established in 2013